Events in the year 1827 in Portugal.

Incumbents
Monarch: Mary II

Events
Centro de Apoio Social de Runa opened

Births
13 August – Francisco Gomes de Amorim, poet, dramatist, and novelist (died 1891).

Deaths

18 January – José António Camões, Catholic priest, poet and historian (b. 1777)
6 November – Miguel Pereira Forjaz, Count of Feira, general (b. 1769)

References

 
1820s in Portugal
Portugal
Years of the 19th century in Portugal
Portugal